Furush Beit Dajan is a Palestinian village in the northern West Bank, located 10 kilometers east of Nablus and a part of the Nablus Governorate. According to the Palestinian Central Bureau of Statistics, the village had a population of approximately 1,160 inhabitants in 2006.

History
Most of Furush Beit Dajan's residents are Bedouins or descendants of Bedouins who migrated from the village of Yattir in the Negev desert after being evicted by Israeli authorities in 1952. Most have abandoned their nomadic lifestyle and have adapted to farming. However, many still herd sheep and goats to the north of the village where there is a natural grazing area. Furush Beit Dajan receives most of its water from springs in the southern part of the village.

Post-1967
After the Six-Day War in 1967,  Furush Beit Dajan  has been under Israeli occupation.

After  the 1995 accords, 100% of village land, that is 20,083 dunams,  has been defined as  Area C territory.

Israel has confiscated  1,370 dunams of Furush Beit Dajan's land for the Israeli settlement of Hamra, Bik'at HaYarden, in addition to taking 192 dunams for a military checkpoint  close to the settlement.

References

External links
 Survey of Western Palestine, Map 12:  IAA,   Wikimedia commons
 Furush Beit Dajan Village profile, Applied Research Institute–Jerusalem (ARIJ)
   Furush Beit Dajan, aerial photo, ARIJ
 Development Priorities and Needs in Furush Beit Dajan, ARIJ

Villages in the West Bank
Municipalities of the State of Palestine